Carlos Lapetra Coarasa (29 November 1938 – 24 December 1995) was a Spanish footballer who played as a forward.

He spent ten of his 11 years as a professional with Zaragoza, appearing in 279 official games (62 goals) and winning three major titles with the club.

A Spain international during the 1960s, Lapetra represented the country at the 1964 European Nations' Cup and the 1966 World Cup, winning the former tournament.

Club career
Lapetra was born in Zaragoza, Aragon, as his parents had relocated to the city from Huesca due to the Spanish Civil War. After one year in the lower leagues with CD Guadalajara he signed with Real Zaragoza in 1959, remaining with the latter until his retirement.

During his one-decade spell at the La Romareda, Lapetra was part of an attacking unit that also featured Canário, Marcelino, Eleuterio Santos and Juan Manuel Villa, dubbed Los Magníficos (The Magnificent). He helped the club to four Copa del Rey finals in the 1960s, winning twice and scoring in both matches, against Atlético Madrid in 1964 and Athletic Bilbao in 1966.

Lapetra retired from football at only 30, due to recurrent injury problems and as Zaragoza did not renew his contract. He settled in Huesca subsequently, working in directorial capacities with SD Huesca and the Spain national team. Lapetra died on 24 December 1995 at the age of 57, due to cancer.

International career
Lapetra earned 13 caps for Spain, during three years. He was part of the squads that appeared at the 1964 European Nations' Cup (starting in the 2–1 final win against the Soviet Union in the place of legendary Francisco Gento) and the 1966 FIFA World Cup (featured in the 1–2 group stage loss to West Germany).

International goals

Personal life
Lapetra's older brother, Ricardo, was also a footballer. He too played for Zaragoza, but with much less success.

Honours

Club
Zaragoza
Copa del Generalísimo: 1963–64, 1965–66
Inter-Cities Fairs Cup: 1963–64

International
Spain
UEFA European Championship: 1964

References

External links

1938 births
1995 deaths
Footballers from Zaragoza
Spanish footballers
Association football forwards
La Liga players
Tercera División players
CD Guadalajara (Spain) footballers
Real Zaragoza players
Spain international footballers
1964 European Nations' Cup players
1966 FIFA World Cup players
UEFA European Championship-winning players